Ambivalent prejudice is a social psychological theory that states that, when people become aware that they have conflicting beliefs about an outgroup (a group of people that do not belong to an individual's own group), they experience an unpleasant mental feeling generally referred to as cognitive dissonance. These feelings are brought about because the individual on one hand believes in humanitarian virtues such as helping those in need, but on the other hand also believes in individualistic virtues such as working hard to improve one's life.

Bernard Whitley and Mary Kite contend that this dissonance motivates people to alter their thoughts in an attempt to reduce their discomfort. Depending on the situation or context that has primed them, people will give priority to either the positive beliefs or the negative beliefs, leading to a corresponding behavioral shift known as response amplification.

Theoretical framework
According to Susan Fiske, there are two underlying characteristics of stigmatized groups around the world: the ideas that status predicts perceived competence and that cooperation predicts perceived warmth. Two combinations of competence and warmth produce ambivalent prejudices. The combined perception of groups as warm but incompetent leads to pitied groups, such as traditional women or older people. The combined perception of groups as competent but cold leads to envied groups, such as nontraditional women or minority entrepreneurs. Fiske uses this conception of prejudice to explain ambivalent sexism, heterosexism, racism, anti-immigrant biases, ageism, and classism.

Views
According to Whitley and Kite, ambivalent prejudice comes from one person having both good and bad thoughts about an outgroup. The example in their book The Psychology of Prejudice and Discrimination talks about race and how some people often have ambivalent attitudes towards people of other races. This means that their behavior is also ambivalent: "sometimes it is positive, sometimes negative."

Irwin Katz said that ambivalent prejudice occurs when only the individual becomes aware of the conflicting attitudes, which can be caused for most people simply by coming face to face with someone from the outgroup. According to Katz, that conflict of attitudes can cause problems with one's self-image because it seems as if one is not living up to all important values that one holds. The conflict can cause negative emotions, which are expressed in negative behavior.

Irwin Katz and Glen Hass (1988) believed that contradicting American values are to blame for ambivalent prejudice. The first value is that hard work will always pay off and people get what they deserve, bur the other value is that all people are equal and that people should help the less fortunate. When that is applied to race, many people are torn. They see disadvantaged people of other races as not working hard enough to be worth as much as people of their own race, but they also understand that people of other race have a harder time financially and socially. Those mixed emotions lead to ambivalence.

Tara MacDonald and Mark Zanna suggested that stereotypes were to blame for ambivalent prejudice. According to MacDonald and Zanna, people can like others and respect others, and both emotions work independently of each other. When a person feels those things towards an entire group, it is because of stereotypes.  Therefore, a person can like and disrespect people of other races because of certain stereotypes, or they can dislike but respect the same group of people for other stereotypes.

In a study testing the nature of ambivalent prejudice, Hisako Matsuo and Kevin McIntyre (2005) studied American attitudes toward immigrant groups. He proposed that ambivalent prejudice stems from two views. There is the individualistic attitude that values the Protestant work ethic, an attitude that is associated with more negative attitudes toward outgroups. The other view is an egalitarian or humanitarian one, which is associated with more positive attitudes toward outgroups.

Measures
Researchers use a variety of methods to measure ambivalent prejudice. The most widely used method is the Ambivalent Sexism Inventory (ASI) for sexism created by Glick and Fiske in 1996. Typical of all ingroup-outgroup relations, one group (men) has a much greater societal status because to male ambivalence has three sources: paternalism, gender differentiation, and heterosexuality. The assessment measures an individual's endorsement of ambivalent sexism, a theory of that postulates that male ambivalence has three sources: paternalism, gender differentiation, and heterosexuality.

Women who resist traditional gender roles are punished by hostile sexism which resembles old-fashioned sexism. The theory predicts resentment of nontraditional women along each dimension: dominative paternalism, competitive gender differentiation, and heterosexual hostility. Conversely, women who co-operate with traditional gender roles and relationships evoke benevolent sexism, which comprises protective paternalism, complementary gender differentiation, and heterosexual intimacy. The ASI measures sexism along all of the six dimensions that compose hostile sexism and benevolent sexism.

The ASI is a self-report measure composed of 22 items, 11 for each subscale: hostile sexism and benevolent sexism. Both subscales can be either calculated separately or averaged together to get an overall measure of sexism. The assessment consist of a series of statements with which respondents indicate their level of agreement on a 6-point Likert scale in which 0 means disagree strongly and 5 means agree strongly.

Certain items are reversed coded so that agreement with the statement indicates lower levels of sexism and disagreement with the statement indicates higher levels of sexism. Example items from the ASI include:

Below is a series of statements concerning men and women and their relationships in contemporary society that this study wrote for their subjects to evaluate.

Benevolent sexism subset:
People are often truly happy in life without being romantically involved with a member of the other sex.
No matter how accomplished he is, a man is not truly complete as a person unless he has the love of a woman. 
Men are complete without women.
Every man ought to have a woman whom he adores. 
Women should be cherished and protected by men.
Women, as compared to men, tend to have a more refined sense of culture and good taste.
Women, compared to men, tend to have superior moral sensibility.
Many women have a quality of purity that few men possess.

Hostile sexism subset:
Women exaggerate problems they have at work. 
Most women interpret innocent remarks or acts as being sexist. 
Women are too easily offended.
Most women fail to appreciate fully all that men do for them.  
Feminists are not seeking for women to have more power than men.
There are actually very few women who get a kick out of teasing men by seeming sexually available and then refusing male advances.
Researchers use various other methods to measure different types of ambivalent prejudices. For example, the Modern Racism Scale measures aspects of ambivalent racism.

Applications

Sexism
Ambivalent sexism reflects the duality of hostility towards women and the tendency for women to be rated more positively than men in surveys. Hostile sexism impacts those perceived as nontraditional women who threaten male power, for example, female professionals and intellectuals, feminists, and political lesbians. Conversely, benevolent sexism protects women who are perceived as adhering to traditional gender roles, such as housewives and secretaries. Fiske asserts that these two forms of sexism comprise ambivalence. On the one hand, women are viewed as competent but not warm, while on the other hand, they are viewed as warm but incompetent. In the workplace, nontraditional women tend to suffer from hostile sexism since they are viewed as competitors. As benevolent sexism includes perceived obligations of protection and help, it leads to women being viewed as less worthy of hiring, training, and promoting due to the concern of them being less able to effectively manage both personal and professional. Fiske contends that when addressing bias against women, both demeaning benevolence and dangerous hostility must be account for.

Racism
Ambivalent racism depicts two contrasting reactions by whites toward blacks. These competing evaluations include hostile (antiblack) sentiments and subjectively sympathetic but paternalistic (problack) sentiments. Problack attitudes attribute black disadvantage to larger social structures and factors including discrimination, segregation, and lack of opportunities. In contrast, hostile antiblack racism, like old-fashioned racism asserts that "black people are unambitious, disorganized, free-riding, and do not value education." Fiske states that "black Americans are viewed ambivalently mainly to the extent that white Americans simultaneously harbor a more subjectively positive and a more hostile attitude, which can flip from one polarity to the other, depending on individual differences in beliefs and on situational cues."

Ableism
Söder suggests that people do not have fixed cognitive assumptions or emotions about people with disabilities. Rather, people are ambivalent, so their behavior in any given situation will depend on the context. People have two contrasting ideas about people with disabilities; people devalue disabilities while maintaining a benevolent sympathy towards disabled people. This leads to a conflict between basic values held by wider society and moral dilemmas in concrete daily interactions with people with disabilities. Söder proposes an ambivalence model as a better method for evaluating interactions with and attitudes about disabled people as it better captures the totality of people's sentiments.

Xenophobia
Matsuo and McIntyre applied the concept of ambivalent prejudice to immigrants and refugees. They described attitudes toward immigrants and refugees as ambivalent since on the one hand they are perceived "sympathetically, as disadvantaged, and deserving of justice", but on the other hand, they are seen as "more likely to be involved in crime and a burden on the public system." Matsuo and McIntyre used a sample survey of college students to test egalitarianism and the Protestant work ethic (PWE) and how it relates to perceptions of refugees. Participants completed survey questions regarding social contact, attitudes toward specific ethnic groups, general attitudes toward refugees, and the Humanitarianism/Protestant Work Ethic Scale. They found that the ambivalent attitudes toward refugees is based on the "dual maintenance of American values", egalitarianism and PWE. In testing the contact theory, they found that only when contact is personal and cooperative does prejudice decrease.

Response amplification
In order to reduce the negative feelings brought about by cognitive dissonance, people may engage in response amplification. Response amplification is defined by engaging in a more extreme response to a stigmatized individual in comparison to a similar but non-stigmatized individual than the situation calls for.  This can include overdoing both positive responses and negative responses depending on whether the situation calls for a positive or negative response.

For example, whites' evaluations of blacks who are presented positively or negatively tend to be more extreme than evaluations of similar white individuals. Hass et al. (1991) had white students participate in an experiment in which each of them worked with either a white or black confederate to complete a task. The confederate, as instructed by the experimenter, caused the failure or the successful achievement of the task. After the task, the white students rated the confederate's performance. Those who scored higher in ambivalence rated the black confederate more positively in the success condition but more negatively in the failure condition than the white confederate. David Bell and Victoria Esses (2002) conducted a study indicated that response amplification occurs only when one believes that the ambivalent response is problematic. When ambivalent white Canadian students were given essays that emphasized the positivity or negativity of ambivalence (considering both the good and bad in a situation or person), only those in the negative condition engaged in response amplification.

In addition to racial contexts, response amplification has been found in multiple contexts including in cases of able bodied people interacting with disabled individuals, women and men rating members of the opposite sex, and ratings of female feminists.

Mitigation
Leippe and Eisenstadt found that dissonance mediated changed may be more successful when an internal conflict already exists, that is, when individuals possess cognitive dissonance that can be a result of ambivalence. In three experiments, whites were encouraged to write essays regarding scholarship policies that would favor blacks. Writing the essay led to a more positive perception of the policy, as well as, in some cases, more positive attitudes towards blacks in general. Ambivalent people were more likely to comply with writing a positive essay than non ambivalent people. As a result of writing the essay, participants felt cognitive dissonance which led them to engage in a sort of cognitive restructuring to further reduce the dissonance. This meant engaging in more extended thinking that led to more positive beliefs about Blacks in general as well as about the specific policy. By inducing compliance in writing, they were able to induce a change in attitudes toward the target group.

Fiske suggests several methods to mitigate ambivalent prejudice particularly in the context of business management. These methods mainly involve an increased awareness and recognition of the different types of prejudice. She states that not all prejudices are alike, but they do create predictable groups of stereotypes, emotional prejudices, and discriminatory tendencies. When working to counteract prejudice, the focus should be on the most stereotypically negative aspect for a group, for example, competence for older people. In addition, constructive contact, that involving cooperation and equal status in the setting, for example, between groups improves emotional intelligence.

See also
Benevolent prejudice
Hostile prejudice
Ingroups and outgroups
Role congruity theory
Women are wonderful
Aversive racism
Tokenism
Allosemitism

References

Prejudices